New Rochelle Mall was an enclosed shopping mall located in the downtown business district of the suburban city of New Rochelle, Westchester County, New York. Construction began somewhere and sometime between the 1940s and 1960s, with the mall opening in 1968, but had closed in 1992 with the entire site demolished in 1998.

The mall complex covered four large downtown blocks and was composed of 100 retail shops covering , a three-level,  department store, and a 1,900-car garage.
It also included a 1204-seat Century Mall Theater as well as being linked to an adjacent eight-story office building and hotel tower, both of which still remain.

Plans were in the works for the mall to undergo a $30 million, 50 percent expansion, with the addition of a 12-story building that was to include a 12-screen movie theater and eight floors of offices. 
The expansion, intended to aid in the revitalization of New Rochelle's downtown, was scheduled for completion in 1991.  Those developments were later dropped and never completed.

The mall's end came with the bankruptcy of Macy's and its closing of the New Rochelle branch in 1992. The vacancy rate in the mall by then was already high, and the mall was formally closed and demolished by spring 1998. It was eventually replaced by the New Roc City entertainment complex which opened in 1999. New Roc features a 19-screen movie theater, Westchester County's first IMAX theater (preceding White Plains City Center's Cinema de Lux), a health club, an ice rink (now Monroe College Athletic Center), restaurants, shopping centers and an indoor amusement park.

References

Buildings and structures in New Rochelle, New York
Shopping malls in New York (state)
Buildings and structures in Westchester County, New York
Shopping malls established in 1968
Demolished shopping malls in the United States
Demolished buildings and structures in New York (state)
Buildings and structures demolished in 1998